Ain Saadeh (also spelled Ain Saadée and Ain Saade) is a suburb located northeast of the capital Beirut in Lebanon.

Demography

Ain Saade is a traditional Christian village located in the mountains of Lebanon overlooking the Mediterranean Sea, with approximately 10,000 residents and 2,000 voters. The village has several nurseries, schools, colleges, technical institutes, universities, and various amenities and facilities.

The village in addition has a large range of active groups including the Legion Marie, Boy Scouts, sports clubs, etc., as well as several churches and an orphanage. Furthermore, the village has several industrial, commercial, residential and agriculture zones.

Ain Saadeh is located about 10 kilometers away from Beirut at an altitude ranging from 200 to 700 meters above sea level. There are several possible routes to Ain Saade:
Through Mkalles to Mansourieh
Through Fanar
Through Nahr El Mawt, Roumieh
Through Ras el Matn
Through Brummana to Beit Mery

Etymology
The name "Ain Saadeh" means "Spring of Happiness," referring to the town's natural spring.

Education

Schools:
Collège des Frères Mont La Salle - French international school
Sagesse High School
Collège des sœurs des saints-cœurs Ain Najm, http://www.ainnajm.sscc.edu.lb/

References

External links
 Ain Saadeh, Localiban 

Populated places in the Matn District
Maronite Christian communities in Lebanon
Christian cities in Lebanon